Gary Holmes (born 10 November 1965) is a Canadian wrestler. He competed at the 1988 Summer Olympics and the 1992 Summer Olympics. He is the brother of Lawrence Holmes.

References

External links
 

1965 births
Living people
Canadian male sport wrestlers
Olympic wrestlers of Canada
Wrestlers at the 1988 Summer Olympics
Wrestlers at the 1992 Summer Olympics
Sportspeople from Georgetown, Guyana
Commonwealth Games medallists in wrestling
Commonwealth Games gold medallists for Canada
Wrestlers at the 1986 Commonwealth Games
Pan American Games medalists in wrestling
Pan American Games silver medalists for Canada
Pan American Games bronze medalists for Canada
Wrestlers at the 1987 Pan American Games
Wrestlers at the 1999 Pan American Games
Guyanese emigrants to Canada
Black Canadian sportspeople
Medalists at the 1987 Pan American Games
Medalists at the 1999 Pan American Games
Medallists at the 1986 Commonwealth Games
20th-century Canadian people